D27 may refer to:

Ships 
 , a Gearing-class destroyer of the Argentine Navy
 , a Pará-class destroyer of the Brazilian Navy
 , a Garcia-class destroyer of the Brazilian Navy
 , an escort carrier briefly commissioned into the Royal Navy
 , a W-class destroyer of the Royal Navy

Other uses 
 D27 road (Croatia)
 Dewoitine D.27, a French monoplane fighter aircraft 
 GER Class D27, a class of steam locomotives
 Progress D-27, a Ukrainian propfan engine
 VL D.27 Haukka II, a Finnish fighter aircraft
 LNER Class D27, a class of British steam locomotives
 GER Class D27, a class of British steam locomotives